Bernt Bessesen Lie (13 July 1868 – 14 July 1916) was a Norwegian novelist.

He was born in Mandal as a son of stipendiary magistrate Emil Bernhard Lie (1836–1891) and Nicoline Bessesen. Through his sister Ida, he was the brother-in-law of Gjert Lindebrække and an uncle of Sjur Lindebrække and Tikken Manus. Through his brother Vilhelm Lie he was an uncle of Nils Lie. Through his father's brother, writer Jonas Lie he was a first cousin of Michael Strøm Lie, writers Mons Lie and Erik Lie, and a first cousin once removed of Erik's son, the Nazi Jonas Lie. He was a second cousin of Erika Lie, Karl Nissen, painter Jonas Lie and Eyolf Soot.

Lie's family soon moved away from Mandal. They lived in Trondhjem and Kristiania before moving to Tromsø when Bernt Lie was 15 years old. He finished his secondary education here in 1886, and moved to study law. He graduated with the cand.jur. degree in 1891. In October 1894 in Kristiania Bernt Lie married Hedvig Mariboe Aubert (1874–1946). They had the son Emil Lie, who became a sculptor, and their daughter Didi Lie married Supreme Court Justice, banker, politician and ambassador Arne Sunde. While the children were still young, though, Bernt Lie's family lived abroad, mainly in Rome, until 1910 when they settled in Lillehammer.

His debut novel was I Æventyrland, released in 1892. Mot Overmagt (1907) is regarded as being his best book. His four boys' books are also remembered; Sorte Ørn (1893), Svend Bidevind (1897), Peter Napoleon (1900) and Guttedage (1905). His last book  was En Racekamp (1915). He wrote popular books, and was one of the more widely read authors in his time. He died in July 1916 in Sandefjord, and was buried in Tromsø.

References

External links 

Digitized books by Lie in the National Library of Norway

1868 births
1916 deaths
19th-century Norwegian novelists
20th-century Norwegian novelists
Norwegian male short story writers
Norwegian expatriates in Italy
19th-century Norwegian short story writers
20th-century Norwegian short story writers
20th-century Norwegian male writers
People from Mandal, Norway